Park City Wind is a proposed offshore wind farm to be located about  off the coast of Martha's Vineyard (MA) on Outer Continental Shelf in U.S. territorial waters of the East Coast of the United States. It will provide electriity to the state of Connecticut. Avangrid is the developer.

The project takes its name from the nickname of Bridgeport, Connecticut, where a offshore wind port is being developed to support the project at Bridgeport Harbor. Electric transmission cables from the project will make an underground landfall at Craigville Beach in Barnstable, Massachusetts. 

As of 2022 a draft environmental impact statement (DEIS) and a construction and operations plan (COP) had been submitted to BOEM. It is projected to be commissioned in 2027.

See also
Wind power in Connecticut
List of offshore wind farms in the United States

References

External links 
Park City Wind

Wind power in Connecticut
Wind power in Massachusetts
Proposed wind farms in the United States
Offshore wind farms in the United States